Kris Holden-Ried (born August 1, 1973) is a Canadian actor.

Early life and pentathlon
Holden-Ried was born in Pickering, Ontario. He studied at Montreal's Concordia University School of Business. He was a champion competitor in riding and fencing, and is a former member of the Canadian National Pentathlon Team and has a silver medal from both the Pan American and Pan Pacific Pentathlon Championships.

Career
At his first audition, he landed the leading role in 12th century drama, Young Ivanhoe. In 2007, he portrayed William Compton in the first seven episodes of the Showtime series The Tudors. In 2010, he began appearing in the television series Lost Girl as Dyson. He played Quint Lane, the 'super lycan', in the film Underworld: Awakening (2012).  In 2013, he voiced Captain Canuck in the animated web series of the same name. Holden-Ried provided the voice for the character Crawford Starrick, the main antagonist; on the hit video game Assassin's Creed: Syndicate.

Personal life
Holden-Ried has one child, a son.

Filmography

References

External links
 
 

1973 births
Living people
Canadian male film actors
Canadian people of Latvian descent
Canadian male television actors
Canadian male voice actors
People from Pickering, Ontario
20th-century Canadian male actors
21st-century Canadian male actors
Male actors from Ontario